Peoria Civic Center is an entertainment complex located in downtown Peoria, Illinois. Designed by Pritzker Prize winning architect Philip Johnson and John Burgee, it has an arena, theater, exhibit hall and meeting rooms. It opened in 1982 and completed an expansion to its lobby and meeting facilities in 2007. On the grounds of the Peoria Civic Center sits the massive "Sonar Tide," the last and largest sculpture of the pioneer of abstract minimalism Ronald Bladen.

History
The site of the Civic Center includes the spot at Liberty Street and Jefferson Street, where Moses and Lucy Pettengill lived from 1836 to 1862; that house was part of the Underground Railroad and Moses was also an Underground Railroad "conductor". In 1862, the Pettingills moved out of downtown and to Moss Avenue, where the present Pettengill–Morron House was built in 1868. The downtown home was demolished in 1910 to make way for the Jefferson Hotel.  The hotel, in turn, was imploded in 1978 to make way for the Civic Center.

The first event at the Civic Center was a home and garden show in the Exhibit Hall in February 1982.

Facilities

Carver Arena
Carver Arena has been hosts to acts such as Eagles, Elton John, Bob Seger, Kiss, Blake Shelton, Eric Church, Luke Bryan, Luke Combs, Jason Aldean, Cher, Janet Jackson, James Taylor, Avenged Sevenfold, Shinedown, Godsmack, Five Finger Death Punch, The Harlem Globetrotters, World Wrestling Entertainment, Disney, Monster Jam, Hot Wheels Monster Trucks Live, Disney on Ice, and basketball exhibition games for the Chicago Bulls.

, seating capacity was 9,919 for hockey and indoor football, 11,433 for basketball and up to 12,036 for concerts.

Bob Seger set the record for the highest-grossing concert in venue history on January 22, 2019. The previous record was held by an Elton John concert in 2011.

Reba McEntire set a record for top-selling country concert in venue history on March 18, 2022. Previous record holder was Blake Shelton. 

Carver Arena hosted the Illinois High School Association boys' basketball state finals for two weeks every March from 1996 until 2019. The interactive March Madness Experience took place in the adjacent exhibition hall during the tournaments.

Theater
Steve Martin and Martin Short's Now You See Them, Soon You Won't event on April 20, 2019, set the record for top comedy show in Peoria Civic Center Theater's History.

Harry Connick Jr. set a new box office record for a concert in the theater with his December 3, 2022 performance. 

Pollstar ranked the Peoria Civic Center Theater as the 96th top selling theater in the world and 3rd in state of Illinois behind Chicago based venues - Chicago Theatre and Rosemont Theatre.

Tenants
 Peoria Symphony Orchestra
 Peoria Ballet
 Bradley Men's Basketball 
 Peoria Rivermen (SPHL)

See also
 List of convention centers in the United States
 List of NCAA Division I basketball arenas

External links
Official Site

 Carver Arena at BradleyBraves.com — short history of Bradley University basketball at Carver Arena

References

1982 establishments in Illinois
Basketball venues in Illinois
Bradley Braves basketball
Buildings and structures in Peoria, Illinois
College basketball venues in the United States
Concert halls in Illinois
Convention centers in Illinois
Event venues established in 1982
Indoor arenas in Illinois
Indoor ice hockey venues in Illinois
Music venues in Illinois
Peoria Rivermen
Sports venues completed in 1982
Sports venues in Peoria, Illinois
Theatres in Illinois
Tourist attractions in Peoria, Illinois